Manny Marroquin (born September 21, 1971) is an American mixing engineer. He has received ten Grammy awards for his professional audio work.

Life and career
Marroquin's family moved to Los Angeles, California when he was nine due to the Guatemalan Civil War. After graduating from Alexander Hamilton High School in Los Angeles, he began working at Enterprise Studios as a runner and worked his way up to an engineering position. His professional breakthrough came during a late night session when a producer asked him to do a rough mix. The producer was impressed with Marroquin's work and asked him to mix the entire album.

As a mix engineer, Marroquin has  worked with such well-known artists as Whitney Houston, 2Pac, Pink, John Mayer, Shakira, Maroon 5, Rihanna, Ludacris, Jazmine Sullivan, and Duffy.

He won his first Grammy in 2000 for Mary Mary's album, Thankful. In 2004, he received two Grammys for  Album of the Year for Kanye West's The College Dropout, and Alicia Keys' The Diary of Alicia Keys. He earned a Grammy for his work on the album Get Lifted by John Legend In 2005, and Battle Studies by John Mayer in 2011. The Grammy Museum, which opened in Los Angeles in December 2008, acknowledged Marroquin's musical achievement with its mixing exhibit. The interactive exhibit allowed players to mix a track under the guidance of Marroquin.

Marroquin partnered with Waves Audio to release a bundle of virtual instrument effects. It was created in collaboration with Marroquin and includes EQ, Delay, Reverb, Tone Shaper, Triple D & Distortion plugins. The plugins have been marketed as personalized hybrid processors inspired by Marroquin's own workflow.

Marroquin resides in Los Angeles, California.

Marroquin works from Larrabee Studios in Los Angeles. He was originally a key client, but has since become the majority owner of the studio.

Discography
1996: Toni Braxton Secrets LaFace Records (Various Tracks)
1996: Seal  "Don’t Cry" Sire Records Company
1997: 2PAC R U Still Down? (Remember Me) Jive (Various Tracks)
1999: Warren G "I Want It All" Restless Records
2000: Mary Mary "Thankful" Columbia
2000: Sisqó Unleash the Dragon Def Soul (Various Tracks)
2000: Pink Can't Take Me Home LaFace Records (Various Tracks)
2001: Alicia Keys Songs in A Minor J Records (Various Tracks)
2001: Sisqó Return of Dragon Def Soul (Various Tracks)
2002: Mario Mario J Records (Various Tracks)
2002: Santana Shaman Arista (Various Tracks)
2003: Alicia Keys The Diary J Records
2004: Twista Kamikaze Atlantic (Various Tracks)
2004: John Legend Get Lifted Sony BMG
2004: Kanye West The College Dropout Roc-A-Fella
2005: Faith Evans The First Lady Capitol Records (Various Tracks)
2005: Mariah Carey The Emancipation of Mimi Island Def Jam Music Group (Various Tracks)
2005: Natasha Bedingfield Unwritten BMG UK & Ireland (Various Tracks)
2005: Kanye West Late Registration Roc-A-Fella (Various Tracks)
2005: Anthony Hamilton Soulife Atlantic Records (Various Tracks)
2005: Twista The Day After Atlantic Records (Various Tracks)
2005: Common Be Geffen Records (Various Tracks)
2006: Janet Jackson Damita Jo Toshiba EMI Ltd. (Various Tracks)
2006: T.I. King Atlantic Records/Grand Hustle (Various Tracks)
2006: Fantasia Fantasia J Records (Various Tracks)
2006: John Mayer Continuum Columbia (Various Tracks)
2007: Rihanna Good Girl Gone Bad Def Jam Recordings (Various Tracks)
2007: Kanye West Graduation Def Jam (Various Tracks)
2007: Alicia Keys As I Am J Records
2008: Kanye West 808s & Heartbreak Def Jam
2008: John Legend Evolver Sony BMG
2008: Los Lonely Boys Forgiven Epic Records
2008: Brandy Human Epic Records (Various Tracks)
2008: Jazmine Sullivan Fearless J Records
2008: Anastacia Heavy Rotation Mercury Records
2008: Mary Mary "Get Up" Sony BMG
2008: Usher Here I Stand LaFace (Various Tracks)
2008: Empire of the Sun "Walking on a Dream"
2010: Miguel "All I Want Is You" Jive
2011: Pitbull "International Love" Planet Pit
2012: Imagine Dragons Continued Silence EP Interscope Records
2012: Linkin Park Living Things Warner Bros. Records
2012: Nelly Furtado The Spirit Indestructible Interscope Records
2012: Imagine Dragons Night Visions Interscope Records (Various Tracks)
2012: Miguel Kaleidoscope Dream RCA
2012: Bruno Mars Unorthodox Jukebox Atlantic Records
2013: Tegan and Sara Heartthrob  Warner Bros. Records (Various Tracks)
2013: Tyler, the Creator Wolf Columbia Records (Various Tracks)
2014: Enrique Iglesias Sex and Love
2014: Sia 1000 Forms of Fear RCA
2014: Linus Young Category 5
2015: Imagine Dragons Smoke + Mirrors
2015: Raury All We Need
2015: X Ambassadors VHS
2015: Justin Bieber Purpose (Several tracks)
2016: Sia This Is Acting RCA
2016: Alessia Cara Know-It-All
2016: Charlie Puth Nine Track Mind Atlantic Records
2016: Rihanna ANTI
2016: DJ Khaled Major Key
2016: Kanye West The Life of Pablo Def Jam (Various Tracks)
2016: Machine Gun Kelly and Camila Cabello "Bad Things"
2016: Meghan Trainor Thank You
2016: Zayn Mind of Mine
2017: John Mayer 'The Search for Everything' Columbia (Various Tracks)
2018: Thirty Seconds to Mars America (Various Tracks) 
2018: Camila Cabello "She Loves Control"
2018: Pharrell Williams and Camila Cabello "Sangria Wine"
2018: Mac Miller Swimming Warner Bros. Records
2018: Charlie Puth Voicenotes Atlantic Records (All Tracks)
2019: Jon Bellion Glory Sound Prep 
2019: Ed Sheeran No.6 Collaborations Project
2019: Selena Gomez Look at Her Now
2019: FKA Twigs "Magdalene (album)" 
2022: Camila Cabello "Familia (album)" 

Filmography:
2011: Justin Bieber: Never Say Never - Island Def Jam
2016: Straight Outta Compton: Music from the Motion Picture

TV Credits:
2012: Justin Bieber: All Around The World - Island Def Jam

Grammy Awards 
The Grammy Awards are presented annually by The Recording Academy. Marroquin has received 8 wins from 36 nominations.

References

External links

Guatemalan emigrants to the United States
1971 births
Grammy Award winners for rap music
Living people
People from Guatemala City
Mixing engineers
Latin Grammy Award winners